The 1956–57 St. Louis Hawks season was the 11th season for the franchise and eighth in the National Basketball Association (NBA). Prior to the start of the season, the Hawks made one of the biggest draft-day deals in NBA history. The Hawks sent 2nd overall pick Bill Russell to the Boston Celtics for Cliff Hagan and second-year star Ed Macauley.
Macauley had been a popular player at St. Louis University. The Hawks struggled for most of the season and coach Red Holzman was fired midway through the season.
The new head coach was Slater Martin, who led the Hawks to a 5–3 record.
Martin did not want the added responsibility of head coach, so Alex Hannum took over for the rest of the season. Despite a 34–38 record, the Hawks claimed the Western Division by a tiebreaker and earned a bye into the Western Finals, where the Hawks swept the Minneapolis Lakers in three straight games. The Hawks met the Boston Celtics in the NBA Finals.
The Hawks won Game 1 in double overtime, 125–123 in Boston.
The Celtics took Game 2 and the Hawks took Game 3 at home by 2 points. After losing Game 5 in Boston, the Hawks needed another victory at home to force a decisive seventh game. Game 7 in Boston went into double overtime and the Celtics emerged victorious, winning by 2 points.

Offseason

NBA Draft

Regular season

Season standings

Record vs. opponents

Game log

Playoffs

|- align="center" bgcolor="#ccffcc"
| 1
| March 14
| Fort Wayne
| W 115–103
| Jack McMahon (24)
| Cliff Hagan (16)
| Kiel Auditorium
| 1–0
|- align="center" bgcolor="#ccffcc"
| 2
| March 16
| Minneapolis
| W 114–111 (OT)
| Cliff Hagan (28)
| Bob Pettit (18)
| Kiel Auditorium
| 2–0
|-

|- align="center" bgcolor="#ccffcc"
| 1
| March 21
| Minneapolis
| W 118–109
| Slater Martin (24)
| Bob Pettit (16)
| Jack McMahon (9)
| Kiel Auditorium6,028
| 1–0
|- align="center" bgcolor="#ccffcc"
| 2
| March 24
| Minneapolis
| W 106–104
| Bob Pettit (30)
| Jack Coleman (15)
| —
| Kiel Auditorium9,451
| 2–0
|- align="center" bgcolor="#ccffcc"
| 3
| March 26
| @ Minneapolis
| W 143–135 (2OT)
| Bob Pettit (35)
| —
| —
| Minneapolis Auditorium
| 3–0
|-

|- align="center" bgcolor="#ccffcc"
| 1
| March 30
| @ Boston
| W 125–123 (2OT)
| Bob Pettit (37)
| Bob Pettit (14)
| —
| Boston Garden5,976
| 1–0
|- align="center" bgcolor="#ffcccc"
| 2
| March 31
| @ Boston
| L 99–119
| Ed Macauley (19)
| Bob Pettit (13)
| Slick Leonard (4)
| Boston Garden13,909
| 1–1
|- align="center" bgcolor="#ccffcc"
| 3
| April 6
| Boston
| W 100–98
| Bob Pettit (26)
| Bob Pettit (28)
| three player tied (5)
| Kiel Auditorium10,048
| 2–1
|- align="center" bgcolor="#ffcccc"
| 4
| April 7
| Boston
| L 118–123
| Bob Pettit (33)
| Bob Pettit (16)
| Martin, Hagan (6)
| Kiel Auditorium10,035
| 2–2
|- align="center" bgcolor="#ffcccc"
| 5
| April 9
| @ Boston
| L 109–124
| Bob Pettit (33)
| Bob Pettit (15)
| Med Park (6)
| Boston Garden13,909
| 2–3
|- align="center" bgcolor="#ccffcc"
| 6
| April 11
| Boston
| W 96–94
| Bob Pettit (32)
| Bob Pettit (23)
| —
| Kiel Auditorium10,053
| 3–3
|- align="center" bgcolor="#ffcccc"
| 7
| April 13
| @ Boston
| L 123–125 (2OT)
| Bob Pettit (39)
| Bob Pettit (19)
| Martin, Coleman (7)
| Boston Garden13,909
| 3–4
|-

Awards and honors
Bob Pettit, All-NBA First Team
Slater Martin, All-NBA Second Team

References

Hawks on Basketball Reference

St. Louis
Atlanta Hawks seasons
St. Louis Hawks
St. Louis Hawks